Kamyshinsky is a rural locality (a khutor) in Sirotinskoye Rural Settlement, Ilovlinsky District, Volgograd Oblast, Russia. The population was 271 as of 2010. There are 4 streets.

Geography 
Kamyshinsky is located in steppe, on south of the Volga Upland, 64 km west of Ilovlya (the district's administrative centre) by road. Shokhinsky is the nearest rural locality.

References 

Rural localities in Ilovlinsky District